Koo De Tah (also Koo Dé Tah or Koo Dee Tah) was a New Zealand/Australian pop music band of the 1980s. The core band members were New Zealander Tina Cross and Russian-Australian Leon Berger; the group was based in Sydney.

In 1984 Cross, who was a successful singer in New Zealand (having four top 50 singles and won the 1979 Pacific Song Contest), moved to Australia and formed the band with Berger. Berger was born in Russia and studied at the Moscow Conservatory of Music. He had moved to Australia in 1973 and released two albums. Prior to forming the group, Berger and Cross had met at a song contest in New Zealand. Koo De Tah scored a hit in 1985 with their debut single, "Too Young for Promises", which reached Number six in the Australian singles charts and Number 48 in New Zealand music charts.

The band's self-titled debut album was released in 1986. Four singles were released, but aside from the high-placing "Too Young For Promises" only one other single, "Body Talk", entered the top 40 in Australia.

Cross went on to have a successful career in musical theatre in New Zealand appearing in Cats, Chicago, The Rocky Horror Show and many other productions. Berger later produced and co-wrote all but one song for the 1992 debut album by Melissa Tkautz, and went on to establish a recording studio.

Koo De Tah is currently not available for streaming on Apple Music and Spotify.

Personnel
 Tina Cross - vocals
 Leon Berger - keyboards, songwriting, production
 Peter Radnai - drums
 John Bettison - guitar, violin
 Capree Morris - keyboards
 Roger Faynes - bass

Discography

Albums

Singles

References

External links
 Gusworld.com.au
 Sergent.com.au
 Tina Cross official website
 Stereolove.com.au

Australian new wave musical groups
Musical groups from Sydney
Musical groups established in 1984
Musical groups disestablished in 1987